Cathedral Rock a is a butte in Sedona, Arizona, United States.

Cathedral Rock may also refer to:

Cathedral Rock, Tasmania, a rock formation in Wellington Park, Tasmania, Australia
Cathedral Rock (New York), in the Adirondack Mountains, New York, United States
Cathedral Rock (Washington), in the Cascade Range, Washington, United States
Cathedral Rock (Colorado), a rock formation on the grounds of the United States Air Force Academy
Cathedral Rock (Coconino County, Arizona), in Glen Canyon National Recreation Area, Arizona, United States
Cathedral Rock, near Waterfall Bluff, South Africa
Cathedral Rock, a rock islet near Norfolk Island
Cathedral Rock, a rock islet near St Abbs, Scotland, United Kingdom
Cathedral Rocks, a series of  cliffs in Victoria Land, Antarctica
Cathedral Rock National Park, in New South Wales, Australia
Cathedral Rock trail, on Mount Charleston, Nevada, United States

See also
Middle Cathedral Rock, a prominent rock face in Yosemite National Park, California, United States